The 2019 New York Lizards season is the nineteenth season for the Lizards franchise of Major League Lacrosse. The Lizards are coming off an 8-6 season in which they finished fourth place in the league standings and grabbed the last playoff spot. The team ultimately lost to their former in-state rival and now Dallas Rattlers, 15-12 in the semifinals.

The Lizards, like most teams in the league, would have to rebuild from a max exodus of players to the new Premier Lacrosse League, a new professional league founded by former Lizard and MLL star Paul Rabil. The Lizards would end up finishing last place in the league standings at 5-11, their worst record since going 4-10 in 2013. It was the first season for the Lizards under the reigns of B.J. O'Hara, four-time Steinfeld Cup-winning coach. O'Hara replaced Joe Spallina officially on December 19, 2018 after Spallina decided to step back into a front office role.

Transactions

Offseason
April 24, 2019 - Midfielder Kevin Crowley and goalie Austin Kaut headline a group of nine players selected by the Lizards in the relocation draft, which was held due to the suspension of the Charlotte Hounds, and folding of the Florida Launch and Ohio Machine.
May 7 - Top overall draft pick (2017) and Long Island native Dylan Molloy signs with the Lizards after two years with the Florida Launch and being cut by the Redwoods Lacrosse Club of the PLL.

In-season
July 11 - The Lizards trade faceoff specialist Noah Rak to the Chesapeake Bayhawks in exchange for defenseman Matt Borges and a fifth round pick in the 2020 Collegiate Draft.

Collegiate Draft
The 2019 Collegiate Draft was held on March 9 in Charlotte, North Carolina at the NASCAR Hall of Fame. Inside Lacrosse gave the Lizards an "B−" in their team-by-team draft grades, despite being limited to only six picks.

Schedule

Standings

References

External links
 Team Website

Major League Lacrosse seasons
New York Lizards